Al-Bariqiyah (also spelled Barqieh) is a village in northwestern Syria, administratively part of the Tartus Governorate, located southeast of Tartus. It is situated between Safita to the west, Mashta al-Helu to the north and the Wadi al-Nasara area to the south. According to the Syria Central Bureau of Statistics (CBS), al-Bariqiyah had a population of 3,627 in the 2004 census. It is the administrative center of the al-Bariqiyah Subdistrict, which consisted of eight localities with a total population of 7,336. Its inhabitants are predominantly Alawites.

References

Populated places in Safita District
Towns in Syria
Alawite communities in Syria